Natthakan Chantam (Thai:ณัฏฐกานต์ จันทร์ธรรม ; , born 1 January 1996) is a Thai cricketer. She plays for the Thailand women's national cricket team as a right-handed opening batter.

International career
She played for the Thailand women's national cricket team in the 2017 Women's Cricket World Cup Qualifier in February 2017.

In June 2018, she was named in Thailand's squad for the 2018 ICC Women's World Twenty20 Qualifier tournament. She made her Women's Twenty20 International (WT20I) debut for Thailand on 3 June 2018, in the 2018 Women's Twenty20 Asia Cup. In November 2018, she was named in the Women's Global Development Squad, to play fixtures against Women's Big Bash League (WBBL) clubs.

In August 2019, she was named in Thailand's squad for the 2019 ICC Women's World Twenty20 Qualifier tournament in Scotland. In January 2020, she was named in Thailand's squad for the 2020 ICC Women's T20 World Cup in Australia. She was the leading run-scorer for Thailand in the tournament, with 103 runs in four matches. In Thailand's last match of the tournament, against Pakistan, she scored 56 to register her country’s first Women’s T20 World Cup half-century, and shared in an opening partnership of 93 with Nattaya Boochatham.

In November 2020, Chantam was nominated for the ICC Women's Associate Cricketer of the Decade award.

Chantam scored consecutive centuries (113 and 120) against the South Africa Emerging side in September 2021, during her team's tour of Zimbabwe and South Africa. In November 2021, she was named in Thailand's team for the 2021 Women's Cricket World Cup Qualifier tournament in Zimbabwe. She played in Thailand's first match of the tournament, on 21 November 2021 against Zimbabwe.

In October 2022, she played for Thailand in Women's Twenty20 Asia Cup.

Franchise career
In October 2020, she was selected to play for the IPL Trailblazers in the 2020 Women's T20 Challenge league, becoming the first Thai cricketer to play in a professional Twenty20 franchise league. In the tournament final, she played a prominent role in the Trailblazers' victory, by diving spectacularly to save a boundary by Jemimah Rodrigues, and then by taking a breakthrough catch in the covers to dismiss Rodrigues off the bowling of Deepti Sharma.

References

Further reading

External links

 
 
 

1996 births
Living people
Natthakan Chantam
Natthakan Chantam
Cricketers at the 2010 Asian Games
Cricketers at the 2014 Asian Games
Natthakan Chantam
Southeast Asian Games medalists in cricket
Natthakan Chantam
Natthakan Chantam
Competitors at the 2017 Southeast Asian Games
Natthakan Chantam
IPL Trailblazers cricketers
IPL Velocity cricketers